Vaughn Richard Shoemaker (August 11, 1902 Chicago, Illinois – August 18, 1991 Carol Stream, Illinois) was an American editorial cartoonist.  He won the 1938 and 1947 Pulitzer Prize for Editorial Cartooning and created the character John Q. Public.

Shoemaker started his career at the Chicago Daily News and spent 22 years there.  His 1938 Pulitzer cartoon for the paper was The Road Back, featuring a World War I soldier marching back to war.  The 1947 winning cartoon for the paper was Still Racing His Shadow, featuring "new wage demands" of workers trying to outrun his shadow "cost of living".  He went on to work for the New York Herald Tribune, the Chicago American, and Chicago Today.  By his 1972 retirement he had drawn over 14,000 cartoons.

He lived in Carol Stream, Illinois and died of cancer at the age of 89.

Gallery

References
 

1902 births
1991 deaths
American editorial cartoonists
Pulitzer Prize for Editorial Cartooning winners
Artists from Chicago
Chicago Daily News people
New York Herald Tribune people
People from Carol Stream, Illinois
Deaths from cancer in Illinois
Christian comics creators